Bomakellia kelleri is a species of poorly understood Ediacaran fossil organism represented by only one specimen discovered in the Ust'-Pinega Formation of the Syuzma River from rocks dated 555 million years old. Bomakellia was originally interpreted as an early Arthropod. A study by B. M. Waggoner even concluded that the organism was a primitive anomalocarid and erroneously identified the ridges of supposed Cephalon as being eyes making Bomakellia the oldest known animal with vision. But this hypothesis has not reached acceptance, nor acknowledgement.

A closer examination of the specimen has identified a tetraradial symmetry in the body, and a frond-like morphology which closely resembles that of Rangea – the current interpretation of Bomakellia is as a rangeomorph frond, which could possibly mean that it's closely related to the Chinese Paracharnia.

See also

 List of Ediacaran genera

 Charniidae

References

Incertae sedis
Rangeomorpha
Charniidae
Ediacaran life
White Sea fossils
Controversial taxa
Fossil taxa described in 1985
Species known from a single specimen